The Slovak Volleyball Federation (SVF), is the governing body for Volleyball in Slovakia since 1993.

History
The Slovak Federation has been recognised by FIVB from 1993 and is a member of Confédération Européenne de Volleyball.

Presidents

See also
Slovakia men's national volleyball team
Slovakia women's national volleyball team

References

External links 

Volleyball in Slovakia
Slovakia
Volleyball